Richard William Jones  was an eminent Welsh Anglican priest.

He was educated at  the University of Wales and St. Michael's College, Llandaff and  ordained in 1904. After curacies in Aberdare and Cutcombe he held incumbencies in Oystermouth, Gorseinon, Llangynidr, Bishopston, Neath and Peterston-super-Ely. He was Archdeacon of Llandaff from 1938, and an Assistant Bishop in the Province of Wales.

He died on 2 June 1953.

References

1953 deaths
Alumni of the University of Wales
Alumni of St Michael's College, Llandaff
Archdeacons of Llandaff
Year of birth missing